Mario de Benito (born 25 September 1958) is a Spanish composer.

Biography 
Mario de Benito was born on 25 September 1958 in Taravilla, province of Guadalajara, receiving a musical education at Madrid's Higher Conservatory of Music and, later, under . After a spell as a member of synth-pop act 'Trópico de Cáncer', he was charged with scoring the 1990 film Alone Together, thereby starting a prolific career as composer in film and television series.

A recurring collaborator of director Enrique Urbizu, de Benito earned a nomination to the Goya Award for Best Original Score for his work in No Rest for the Wicked. Jointly with Richelieu Morris, he had previously scooped another nomination to the Goya Award for Best Original Song for The Witch Affairs "Just Sorcery".

Scored films

References 

Spanish film score composers
1958 births
Living people
People from the Province of Guadalajara

Madrid Royal Conservatory alumni